Carlisle is a town in northern Schoharie County, New York, United States.  The population was 1,758 at the 2000 census.

History 

The town was first settled circa  1760.

The town of Carlisle was established in 1807 from the towns of Cobleskill and Sharon.  Some claim the town is named after Carlisle Pierce, a resident of the town, while others claim it is named after a city in England.

Manufacturing plows was a town industry in the 19th century.

Civil War Medal of Honor recipient John Snyders Kenyon was born on May 5, 1843, in Grovenor Corners.

Geography

The northern town line is the border of Montgomery County, southwest of Amsterdam.

U.S. Route 20, Cherry Valley Turnpike, is an east–west highway across the town. New York State Route 162 crosses the northeastern corner of Carlisle.

Demographics

As of the census of 2000, there were 1,758 people, 628 households, and 476 families residing in the town.  The population density was 51.5 people per square mile (19.9/km2).  There were 728 housing units at an average density of 21.3 per square mile (8.2/km2).  The racial makeup of the town was 97.61% White, 0.40% African American, 0.51% Native American, 0.28% Asian, 0.06% Pacific Islander, 0.28% from other races, and 0.85% from two or more races. Hispanic or Latino of any race were 2.33% of the population.

There were 628 households, out of which 39.3% had children under the age of 18 living with them, 60.5% were married couples living together, 10.7% had a female householder with no husband present, and 24.2% were non-families. 18.0% of all households were made up of individuals, and 6.5% had someone living alone who was 65 years of age or older.  The average household size was 2.80 and the average family size was 3.16.

In the town, the population was spread out, with 29.7% under the age of 18, 7.5% from 18 to 24, 30.3% from 25 to 44, 23.2% from 45 to 64, and 9.2% who were 65 years of age or older.  The median age was 35 years. For every 100 females, there were 100.0 males.  For every 100 females age 18 and over, there were 100.8 males.

The median income for a household in the town was $43,657, and the median income for a family was $48,095. Males had a median income of $32,188 versus $23,646 for females. The per capita income for the town was $17,767.  About 7.9% of families and 8.4% of the population were below the poverty line, including 11.4% of those under age 18 and 7.9% of those age 65 or over.

Communities and locations in Carlisle 
Argusville – A location in the northwestern corner of the town on the town line.
Bear Swamp – A bog north of Little York.
Becker Corners – A hamlet in the southeastern corner of the town at Cripplebush Creek.
Carlisle – A hamlet on US-20.
Carlisle Center – A hamlet near the southern town line on County Road 10, south of Carlisle hamlet.
Cripplebush Creek – A stream flowing out the eastern town boundary to Schoharie Creek.
Grovenor Corners – A hamlet on County Road 10 in the southeastern part of the town.
Little York – A hamlet on US-20 at the western side of the town.
Russell Lake – A small lake on the town line in the southwestern part of Carlisle.

References

External links
  Town of Carlisle, NY
  Early history of Carlyle, NY

Towns in Schoharie County, New York